Beefeater is a chain of over 140 pub restaurants in the United Kingdom, owned by Whitbread.

The chain's name references both the English figure of the beefeater, as well as its menu's meat (particularly beef) offering. The chain is positioned slightly upmarket of Whitbread's Brewers Fayre chain.

History 
Beefeater was set up by the then Whitbread Brewery in 1974 with the opening of its first restaurant, The Halfway House, in Enfield.  The premise was for simple food, such as prawn cocktails and char-grilled steaks, and was seen as a rival to Berni Inns. Beefeater expanded over the next 20 years, before the chain experienced difficulties in the 1990s.

During the 1990s the flagging brand tried a number of strategies to boost sales. A large number of Beefeaters, for example the Ock Mill in Abingdon, and the Crossbush in Arundel, were converted to "Out and Out". This was unsuccessful and they were rebranded back to Beefeater in 2005.  Also a few sites became "Grillbars", but these were soon sold. A "Banter" was launched at the Roundabout Beefeater in Reading, which has since been demolished after it failed. Brian Turner was recruited to advise on the remaining Beefeaters, and his signature dishes and face were featured on the menu.  As the brand declined further, a number of sites, such as "The Cotton Mill" in Kilmarnock and "Craig House" near Inveresk, were rebranded as Brewers Fayre, while others were sold, like the Carpenters Arms in Botley, Oxford, now a McDonald's.

In the early 2000s, the parent company Whitbread invested millions of pounds refurbishing almost all of its Beefeater outlets in a project known internally as "B2".  This involved the complete refurbishment of the restaurants from scratch, retaining nothing of the existing fittings and design. The refurbished restaurants, described by the parent company as "warm, modern and stylish", have been mostly successful and embraced by customers. Main changes included chargrills in all outlets, and many have open plan grill areas so customers can see their meals being prepared. However in 2006, Whitbread sold majority of its standalone sites (Beefeater and Brewers Fayre without a Premier Inn) to Mitchells & Butlers, who closed all the sites and re-branded them to Harvester and Toby Carvery. Whitbread's refurbishment programme was completed in 2008; the last site was the Woolpack outside Ashford in Kent.

2008 saw the Pemberton Beefeater built in Llanelli which was the first new site to open since before 2000. Since then new sites have been built alongside new Premier Inn hotels in locations such as Burgess Hill and Stirling. Also, 2008 Beefeater acquired 10 Brewers Fayre sites such as "The Millfield" in York. Mitchells and Butlers acquired 44 more standalone Beefeaters and Brewers Fayres, such as the Park Place in Mitcham. They were all closed and re-branded again to their aforementioned main brands.

In 2009/2010 Beefeater implemented a remodelling and retraining programme similar to the Brewers Fayre programme. All sites received a partial refurbishment, which featured a new colour scheme, carpets and furniture. In late 2009, the brand became known as Beefeater Grill.

In 2013 a new look and feel was introduced, returning the name to Beefeater. The company introduced a new logo featuring a stylised cow in 2015.

In February 2016, Beefeater opened a new restaurant concept in Birmingham, titled "Bar + Block," bringing Beefeater to the high streets of Britain.

Locations
Beefeater restaurants are located throughout mainland Britain from Inverness "Loch Ness House" to Plymouth "Marsh Mills".  Most restaurants are located alongside major road junctions with a neighbouring Premier Inn, however a few are found in town centres.

References

External links

 

Restaurant groups in the United Kingdom
Whitbread divisions and subsidiaries
Restaurants established in 1974
1974 establishments in England
British companies established in 1974